Pepita Seth is a British-born writer and photographer, known for her accounts of the temple arts and rituals of Kerala and her photographs of the widely celebrated captive elephant, Guruvayur Keshavan. The Government of India honoured her, in 2012, with the Padma Shri, the fourth highest civilian award, for her services to the field of art and culture.

Biography

Pepita Seth was born in Suffolk, East of England, in a family of farmers. Pepita's maternal great grandfather was a soldier who served in the army in the British India. As was the custom during those days, Pepita, being a girl, did not have any formal education. She, choosing a career in films, studied film editing and got opportunities to work under film directors like Ted Kotcheff and Stanley Donen. However, Pepita's life took a turn when she chanced upon the diary of her grandfather and decided to trace his trails with the British Army and document the movements and landed in Kolkata, in 1970.

The journey from Kolkata ended in Guruvayur where she became fascinated by the temple arts and rituals of Kerala. For the next nine years, she visited Kerala several times and, in 1979, she found a home and settled in Guruvayur. Though, at first, she was denied entry to the Guruvayur Temple, her persistence made the Guruvayur Devaswom Board to relent and she remains the only foreigner to be granted entry to the Temple.

Pepita was married to the Indian born British actor Roshan Seth but was estranged from her husband in the late 80s. The couple formally divorced in 2004.

Pepita Seth has extensively covered the rituals and temples of Kerala through her photographs. Her photographs of the elephant, Guruvayur Keshavan have been published in many magazines and journals including the New York Times and the Guardian. It is generally considered that Pepita's photographs of the rituals and temple arts of Kerala have helped promote the image of Kerala as a tourist destination.

Pepita Seth lives in Guruvayur.

Books and articles
Pepita Seth has authored two books on Kerala, with accounts and photographs.

Heaven on Earth: The Universe of Kerala’s Guruvayur Temple is a research study on the Guruvayur Temple and the life, traditions, beliefs, myths and rituals associated with the place. It also covers the elephants fostered by the temple, especially Guruvayur Keshavan, widely regarded as the most famous of them all. The book follows an account with photographs style and has represented the information gathered from various sources, including the priests at the temple. The book is regarded as the first such attempt on the Guruvayur Temple. It consists of 17 chapters and 215 images and covers the history of the 5000-year-old idol, made out of black bismuth, of the temple, and the rituals and poojas, in detail.
 

The Divine Frenzy – Hindu Myths and Rituals of Kerala is an account of the spiritual and practical relationship of the people of Kerala with the deities. It attempts to depict, with text and images, the various rituals associated with Hinduism in Kerala.
 

Pepita Seth has written extensively about Kerala, its rituals and its elephants. She is working on a book on Theyyam, a ritualistic dance form of Kerala.
 

Pepita Seth has written a novel The Edge of Another World (2015) Published by The Speaking Tiger in English and soon to be translated to Malayalam and published by Poorna Publications.

Awards and recognitions
In recognition of her services to the fields of art and culture, the Government of India, in 2012, bestowed the civilian award of Padma Shri on her.

See also

 Guruvayur Temple
 Guruvayur Keshavan
 Theyyam

References

External links
 Honouring Pepitha Seth – News report
 Interview with Pepitha Seth
 Reference on Narthaki.com

1942 births
Living people
Recipients of the Padma Shri in literature & education
English women photographers
20th-century British women
20th-century British photographers
20th-century British writers
Photographers from Suffolk
20th-century women photographers
20th-century English women
20th-century English people